Robert Stapleton may refer to:

 Robert Stapylton, courtier and writer
Robert Stapleton (MP) (died 1606) for Wells (UK Parliament constituency) and Yorkshire